The women's madison competition of the cycling events at the 2019 Pan American Games was held on August 4 at the Velodrome.

Schedule

Results
The final classification is determined in the medal finals.

References

Track cycling at the 2019 Pan American Games
Women's madison